Abdulai Hindolo Bell-Baggie (born 28 April 1992) is a Sierra Leonean footballer who plays as a winger for  club Gosport Borough.

Born in Sierra Leone, Bell-Baggie represented both the England under-16 and England under-17 national teams before winning his first cap for Sierra Leone in 2013. A former Reading player, he has played on loan for Rotherham United, Port Vale, and Crawley Town and was briefly contracted to Yeovil Town and Hayes & Yeading United. He joined Salisbury City in January 2012, before switching to Tranmere Rovers seven months later. After spending three years at Tranmere, he was released before joining Bristol Rovers in March 2015 but failed to make an appearance for the club. He joined Stockport County in June 2015, and moved on to Poole Town in March 2016. He joined Weymouth in October 2017 and helped the club to win the Southern League Premier Division title in 2018–19. He signed with Eastleigh in June 2020 and moved on to Havant & Waterlooville 12 months later. He signed with Salisbury in January 2022 and moved on to Gosport Borough five months later.

Club career

Early career
Bell-Baggie was born in Sierra Leone, and moved to England with his family in 1999, remaining in England with a foster family when his parents returned to Sierra Leone in 2005. He attended Hillside and Bulmershe College in Berkshire as a youth, and became a part of the set-up at Reading at age nine. Though he spent some time at Southampton's youth team, he returned to Reading in 2007. He was awarded a club number in December 2009.

He joined League Two side Rotherham United on a one-month loan in March 2010, making his professional debut as a substitute on 16 March 2010 in a 2–1 defeat at Accrington Stanley, replacing Marcus Marshall a few minutes before full-time. His first start came in a 3–0 defeat at Aldershot on 5 April, after this game the loan spell was extended until the end of the season. However his twelfth and final match for the club was the most significant game of his season, as he replaced Kevin Ellison late into the play-off final defeat to Dagenham and Redbridge at Wembley on 30 May 2010.

In August 2010 he was brought in by Port Vale's Micky Adams on a one-month loan to cover for Lewis Haldane, who was recovering from illness. This move came despite an offer of another loan spell from Rotherham United, and talk of Aldershot expecting the winger to join them on loan. After one substitute appearances he stated his aim to win a place in the starting eleven, however he finished his loan spell with only one start – in the League Trophy, and four substitute appearances to his name. At the end of November he joined Conference National high-flyers Crawley Town on loan, but only made one FA Cup appearance. At the end of the 2010–11 season Bell-Baggie was released by Reading.

In August 2011, Bell-Baggie signed a contract with Yeovil Town to keep him at the League One club until January 2012. In December 2011, Bell-Baggie was informed his short-term contract would not be extended and he was released without making a single appearance. He signed with Conference club Hayes & Yeading United on 6 January, and played in the club's 3–1 defeat at Kidderminster Harriers the next day. On 16 January his ten-day spell at the club came to an end when he was signed by Salisbury City manager Darrell Clarke.

Tranmere Rovers
In July 2012, he joined Tranmere Rovers on trial. Manager Ronnie Moore, who was also manager during the winger's time at Rotherham, was impressed enough to offer Bell-Baggie a one-year contract, which was duly signed. Having featured regularly for the club since his arrival, he signed a new contract on 7 March 2013, keeping him at Tranmere until 2015. He scored two goals in 34 appearances across the 2012–13 campaign. Bell-Baggie played 15 games at the start of the 2013–14 season, but did not make an appearance for Rovers after November as the club suffered relegation out of League One. He was named in the Football League team of the week for his performance in a 3–2 defeat at Accrington Stanley on 6 September 2014, having a bagged a brace in the second half. He was placed on the transfer list in January 2015 by new manager Micky Adams, who had previously coached him at Port Vale, before having his contract cancelled by mutual consent a month later.

Non-League
In March 2015, Bell-Baggie joined Conference Premier club Bristol Rovers on a deal until the end of the 2014–15 season. Rovers won promotion out of the play-offs, though Bell-Baggie never made an appearance for the club. He was released at the end of the season. In June 2015, Bell-Baggie signed for National League North side Stockport County, and was described by manager Neil Young as "an exciting and excellent" player. He was released by new "Hatters" manager Jim Gannon in February after struggling with a series of niggling injuries.

He signed with Poole Town in March 2016. He played four league games towards the end of the 2015–16 season as the "Dolphins" won promotion into the National League South as champions of the Southern League Premier Division. He scored two goals in 35 league games in the 2016–17 campaign, however Poole were barred from competing in the play-offs as Tatnam Ground did not meet National League standard regulations. He left the club on 10 October 2017, following the establishment of home grown talent Ollie Balmer in the first-team.

On 28 October 2017, Bell-Baggie joined Weymouth of the Southern League Premier Division. He made his debut for Mark Molesley's "Terras" later that day in a 4–1 FA Trophy defeat at Hereford on 28 October. He ended the 2017–18 season with five goals in 30 league appearances at the Bob Lucas Stadium, helping Weymouth to secure a place in the play-offs, where they were beaten 3–0 by King's Lynn Town at the semi-final stage. He featured 51 times in the 2018–19 season, scoring five goals, to help Weymouth to win promotion as champions of the Premier Division. He scored ten goals in 33 appearances in the 2019–20 National League South season, which was permanently suspended on 26 March due to the COVID-19 pandemic in England, with Weymouth in the play-offs in third-place.

On 23 June 2020, Bell-Baggie signed for Eastleigh of the National League; manager Ben Strevens said that "He’s stood out on the occasions we’ve watched him. He carries the ball really well and has a really strong attacking threat. I’m really pleased to get it over the line so soon." He scored one goal in 20 league games across the 2020–21 campaign. At the end of the season, it was announced that Bell-Baggie's contract would not be being renewed and he would subsequently be released.

In June 2021, Bell-Baggie joined National League South side Havant & Waterlooville. He scored two goals in 16 games in the first half of the 2021–22 season. On 22 January 2022, Bell-Baggie joined Southern League Premier Division South side Salisbury. Steve Claridge's "Whites" ended the 2021–22 season in 15th-place, with Bell-Baggie scoring one goal in 18 appearances.

On 21 June 2022, he signed with Gosport Borough of the Southern League Premier Division South.

International career
Bell-Baggie turned out for England at both under-16 and under-17 levels. He lifted the Victory Shield in 2007 with the under-16s, Bell-Baggie starting in the 2–0 win over Wales and the 2–1 win against Scotland. In August 2008 he made two appearances for the under-17s, in a 2–1 defeat by Portugal and a 2–0 win over Italy. Bell-Baggie made his senior debut with Sierra Leone in a 1–0 defeat to Cape Verde at the Estádio da Várzea in a World Cup qualifier on 15 June 2013.

Style of play
Rotherham United manager Ronnie Moore considered him to be an "impact player". He went on to say "he's got electric pace. He's brave and strong and has got a lot of goals for the Reserves and kids. He's two footed and can play on the left wing and gets into little pocket. He turns and twists and, even at his young age, he knows the game."

Personal life
In 2011, Bell-Baggie was living with his girlfriend, Natalie, sister of Adam Lallana.

Career statistics

Club statistics

International statistics

Honours
England under-16s
Victory Shield: 2007

Weymouth
Southern League Premier Division: 2018–19

References

1992 births
Living people
English footballers
England youth international footballers
Sierra Leonean footballers
Sierra Leone international footballers
Black British sportspeople
Association football wingers
Sierra Leonean expatriate footballers
Sierra Leonean expatriate sportspeople in the United Kingdom
Sierra Leonean emigrants to the United Kingdom
Expatriate footballers in England
Reading F.C. players
Rotherham United F.C. players
Port Vale F.C. players
Crawley Town F.C. players
Yeovil Town F.C. players
Hayes & Yeading United F.C. players
Salisbury City F.C. players
Tranmere Rovers F.C. players
Bristol Rovers F.C. players
Stockport County F.C. players
Poole Town F.C. players
Weymouth F.C. players
Eastleigh F.C. players
Havant & Waterlooville F.C. players
Salisbury F.C. players
Gosport Borough F.C. players
English Football League players
National League (English football) players
Southern Football League players